Victor Pilirani Chikalogwe is a Malawian LGBT activist and coordinator for the refugee project of PASSOP. He was previously programme coordinator for the orphanage Home of Hope. Chikalogwe initially left Malawi after his family rejected him because of his sexuality, moving to South Africa as there were more LGBT protections in that country.

References

LGBT rights activists
Malawian human rights activists
Malawian LGBT people
Year of birth missing (living people)
Living people